The Romania national futsal team represents Romania in international futsal competitions such as the FIFA Futsal World Cup and the European Championships and is controlled by the Romanian Football Federation.

Tournament records

FIFA Futsal World Cup
 1989 - did not compete
 1992 - did not compete
 1996 - did not compete
 2000 - did not compete
 2004 - did not qualify
 2008 - did not qualify
 2012 - did not qualify
 2016 - did not qualify
 2020 - did not qualify

UEFA Futsal Championship
 1996 - did not compete
 1999 - did not compete
 2001 - did not compete
 2003 - did not compete
 2005 - did not qualify
 2007 – 6th place
 2010 - did not qualify
 2012 – 7th place (Quarterfinals)
 2014 – 6th place (Quarterfinals)
 2016 - did not qualify
 2018 – 12 place
 2022 – Did not qualify

Grand Prix de Futsal
 2005 – did not compete
 2006 – did not compete
 2007 – did not compete
 2008 – did not compete
 2009 –  3rd place
 2010 – 14th place
 2011 – did not compete
 2013 – did not compete
 2014 – did not compete
 2015 – did not compete
 2018 – did not compete

Players

Current squad
The following players were called up to the squad for the UEFA 2024 FIFA Futsal World Cup qualification matches against Finland and Denmark on 1 and 5 March 2023, respectively.
Head coach: Endre Kacso

Recent call-ups
The following players have also been called up to the squad within the last 12 months.

COV Player withdrew from the squad due to contracting COVID-19.
INJ Player withdrew from the squad due to an injury.
PRE Preliminary squad.
RET Retired from international futsal.

Results and fixtures

See also
Romania national beach soccer team
Romania national football team
Romania national minifootball team

References

External links
 UEFA profile

  
Romania
National